Lythraria salicariae (loosestrife flea beetle) is a species of Chrysomelidae family, that is common in the Palaearctic realm east to Korea.

References

Alticini
Beetles described in 1800